68 Squadron or 68th Squadron may refer to:

 Aviation squadrons 
 No. 68 Squadron RAF, a unit of the United Kingdom Royal Air Force 
 68th Fighter Squadron, a unit of the United States Air Force 
 68th Strategic Missile Squadron, a unit of the United States Air Force 
 68th Airlift Squadron, a unit of the United States Air Force 
 68th Information Operations Squadron, a unit of the United States Air Force 

 Ground combat squadrons 
 68 Signal Squadron, a unit of the United Kingdom Army

See also
 68th Regiment (disambiguation)